Panos Polyviou is a Greek former footballer who played as a midfielder.

Career 
Polyviou played in the National Soccer League in 1968 with Toronto Hellas. He returned to play with Hellas for the 1969 season, and the 1970 season. The following season he was traded to Toronto Metros of the North American Soccer League for Jim Lefkos. In 1973, he returned to the NSL to play with Toronto Hungaria. In his debut season with Hungaria he assisted in securing the double (NSL Championship & NSL Cup), and featured in the NSL Cup final against Toronto Croatia.

References  
 

Year of birth missing
Association football midfielders
Greek footballers
Toronto Blizzard (1971–1984) players
Canadian National Soccer League players
North American Soccer League (1968–1984) players
Greek expatriate footballers
Greek expatriate sportspeople in Canada
Expatriate soccer players in Canada